Prince Regent was launched at Dunkirk in 1810 under another name. She may have been taken in prize. She first appeared Lloyd's Register (LR) as Prince Regent in 1822. She made one voyage to the British southern whale fishery. She essentially disappears from online records after her return circa 1826.

Career
As a consequence of missing pages in Lloyd's Register for 1821, Prince Regent first appeared in Lloyd's Register in 1822. She first appeared in the Register of Shipping (RS), in 1823.

On 21 June 1824, Prince Regent sailed from Gravesend, Kent for Otaheite. On 24 August they sailed for the Sandwich Islands. Both arrived at Valparaiso, Active on 18 January 1825, and Prince Regent on 21 January. Active sailed for the Sandwich Islands on 18 February. Active and Prince Regent both arrived at the Friendly Islands on 3 October. On 4 April 1826 Prince Regent, King, master, arrived at Valparaiso from the  Islands. At some point Prince Regent returned to England, carrying 120 tons of sperm and 105 tuns of whale oil.

Fate
Lloyd's Register last listed Prince Regent in 1831, with data unchanged since 1825.

Notes

Citations

1810 ships
Ships built in France
Age of Sail merchant ships of England
Whaling ships